Peter von Allmen (born 21 January 1978) is a Swiss cross-country skier who has been competing since 1997. At the 2010 Winter Olympics in Vancouver he finished 43rd in the individual sprint event.

Von Allmen's best finish at the FIS Nordic World Ski Championships was 16th in the individual sprint event at Val di Fiemme in 2003.

His best World Cup finish was fifth in an individual sprint event at Sweden in 2007.

Von Almen also competes in ski mountaineering events. In 2010, 5th, he finished 1st in the "seniors I" class ranking and 6th in the total ranking at the 14th Patrouille des Glaciers race, together with Stéphane Gay and Andreas Buchs.

Olympic results

World Cup results
All results are sourced from the International Ski Federation (FIS).

World Cup standings

References

External links 

1978 births
Cross-country skiers at the 2010 Winter Olympics
Living people
Olympic cross-country skiers of Switzerland
Swiss male cross-country skiers
Swiss male ski mountaineers